Central Unitaria de Trabajadores may refer to:

 Central Union of Workers, a trade union in Colombia
 Central Unitaria de Trabajadores (Paraguay)
 Unified Workers' Centre, a trade union in Chile